Tour de Rijke is a single-day road bicycle race held annually in June in Spijkenisse, Netherlands. Since 2005, the race is organized as a 1.1 event on the UCI Europe Tour.

Winners

External links
Official Website 

Cycle races in the Netherlands
UCI Europe Tour races
Recurring sporting events established in 1989
1989 establishments in the Netherlands
Sport in Nissewaard
Cycling in South Holland